T in the Park 2008 was the fifteenth T in the Park festival to take place since 1994. It took place on the weekend of Friday 11 July, Saturday 12 July and Sunday 13 July at Balado, in Perth and Kinross, Scotland.  The bands headlining the 2008 event were Rage Against the Machine, The Verve and R.E.M. on the Main Stage and The Chemical Brothers, Kaiser Chiefs and The Prodigy on the Radio 1 / NME Stage.

It was announced that the campsite would open on 10 July 2008 to avoid a repeat of the previous year's traffic problems.

The first batch of "early bird" tickets (approximately 40,000) were released at 9am on the 10 July 2007, selling out in less than 65 minutes with the line up yet to be announced. The next batch of tickets went on sale on 16 February 2008 at 9am. Although tickets sold out in just over an hour.

Incidents
The 2008 festival was marred by two incidents which occurred over the weekend, including the first death at T in the Park.  One man was found dead in his tent, another man was stabbed 11 times by two tea boys after he intervened to stop them harassing a female friend of his.  Fortunately, this incident did not result in a fatality. The organisers have been heavily criticized for the security not stopping the man who smuggled the knife into the festival. There were only 68 arrests at T in 2008, one up from the previous year.

Awards
T in the park won a number of awards for the festival hold in 2008
 Vodafone's Live C4 Festival of the Year
 Best Line Up at the UK Festival Awards by fans * Awarded Scotland's only Green ‘n’ Clean Award by Yourope, Europe's Festival Association in association with Julie's Bicycle
 Awarded three Scottish Event Awards for Best Large Festival, Green Award and overall Event Grand Prix winner

The Festival's green credentials were recognised in 2008 with the award of the Greener Festival Award 2008 from http://agreenerfestival.com who noted that the festival has long been carbon neutral, promoted public transport and had excellent policies to protect the local environment and waterways.

Line ups
The 2008 line-up was as follows:

Main Stage

 The Sugababes were on the line up for the main stage on the Saturday however pulled out for unknown reasons.

Radio 1 / NME Stage

King Tut's Tent

Slam Tent

Pet Sounds Arena

Futures Stage

Relentless Stage

T-break Stage

The Relentless Stage, new to the 2008 version of the festival, was named after and sponsored by Relentless energy drink.

References

2008 in Scotland
T in the Park
2008 in British music
July 2008 events in the United Kingdom
2008 music festivals